Zeynelli is a village in the Yayladere District, Bingöl Province, Turkey. The village is populated by Kurds of the Zimtek tribe and had a population of 77 in 2021.

The hamlets of Ömerler and Vartok are attached to the village.

References 

Villages in Yayladere District
Kurdish settlements in Bingöl Province